Joyce Waddell (born July 11, 1944) is an American politician who has served in the North Carolina Senate from the 40th district since 2015.

References

1944 births
Living people
Democratic Party North Carolina state senators
Place of birth missing (living people)
Women state legislators in North Carolina
21st-century American politicians
21st-century American women politicians